The 1965 Jordan League was the 18th season of Jordan Premier League, the top-flight league for Jordanian association football clubs. Al-Faisaly won its 9th title.

Overview
Al-Faisaly won the championship.

References

RSSSF

External links
 Jordan Football Association website

Jordanian Pro League seasons
Jordan
Jordan
football